Bravo Two Zero is a 1999 two-hour television miniseries (broadcast in two parts between 3 and 4 January in the UK), based on the 1993 book of the same name by Andy McNab. The film covers real life events – from the perspective of Andy McNab, patrol commander of Bravo Two Zero, a British SAS patrol, tasked to find Iraqi Scud missile launchers during the Gulf War in 1991. The names of the patrol members killed were changed.

A previous film about the patrol, The One That Got Away, based on the book of the same name by Chris Ryan, was broadcast in 1996 though it follows the perspective of Corporal Chris Ryan (Colin Armstrong)

Cast

External links

 

1999 British television series debuts
1999 British television series endings
1999 television films
1999 films
British television films
BBC television dramas
Films about the Special Air Service
Films based on non-fiction books
Films set in Iraq
Gulf War films
Prisoner of war films
War films based on actual events
Films based on British novels
War adventure films
Films with screenplays by Troy Kennedy Martin
Films directed by Tom Clegg (director)
1990s English-language films